The British 10,000 metres walk athletics champions covers three competitions; the AAA Championships (1880-2006), the Amateur Athletic Club Championships (1866-1879) and the UK Athletics Championships which existed from 1977 until 1997 and ran concurrently with the AAA Championships.

Where an international athlete won the AAA Championships the highest ranking UK athlete is considered the National Champion in this list. The 10,000 metres walk was discontinued after the 2000 edition.

Past winners

 nc = not contested
 + = UK Championships

References

10,000 metres walk
British
British Athletics Championships